In the NUTS (Nomenclature of Territorial Units for Statistics) codes of the Netherlands (NL), the three levels are:

NUTS codes

Local administrative units

Below the NUTS levels, the two LAU (Local Administrative Units) levels are:

The LAU codes of the Netherlands can be downloaded here:

See also
 Subdivisions of the Netherlands
 ISO 3166-2 codes of the Netherlands
 FIPS region codes of the Netherlands

References

External links
 Hierarchical list of the Nomenclature of territorial units for statistics - NUTS and the Statistical regions of Europe
 Overview map of EU Countries - NUTS level 1
 NEDERLAND - NUTS level 2
 NEDERLAND - NUTS level 3
 Correspondence between the NUTS levels and the national administrative units
 List of current NUTS codes
 Download current NUTS codes (ODS format)
 Provinces of Netherlands, Statoids.com

Netherlands
Nuts